Winterthur Töss railway station is a railway station in the Swiss canton of Zurich and city of Winterthur. It takes its name from that city's quarter of Töss in which it is located. The station is located on the Winterthur to Koblenz via Bülach line. It is an intermediate stop on Zurich S-Bahn service S41, which links Winterthur and Bülach.

References

External links 
 

Railway stations in the canton of Zürich
Swiss Federal Railways stations